{{Infobox American Indian chief
| name            = John Brant| image           = Ahyouwaighs, Chief of the Six Nations. (15247213164).jpg
| image_size      = 
| caption         = 
| tribe           = Mohawk
| lead            = 
| birth_date      = September 27, 1794
| birth_place     = Near today's Brantford, Ontario
| death_date      = 
| death_place     = Near Brantford, Ontario
| predecessor     = 
| successor       = 
| native_name     = Ahyonwaeghs| nicknames       = 
| known_for       = First Indian lawmaker in Upper Canada's parliament; fought in Battle of Queenston Heights, encouraged school construction, resident superintendent, Six Nations of the Grand River
| death_cause     = Cholera 
| resting_place   = 
| rp_coordinates  = 
| religion        = 
| party           = 
| education       = 
| spouse          = 
| partner         = 
| children        = 
| parents         = Joseph Brant (Thayendanegea), Catharine Croghan Brant (Adonwentishon)
| relations       = Uncle, Johannes Tekarihoga
| signature       = 
| footnotes       = 
}}John Brant or Ahyonwaeghs' (September 27, 1794 – August 27, 1832) was a Mohawk chief and government official in Upper Canada.

Brant was born near the current site of Brantford, Ontario, the son of Joseph Brant (Thayendanegea) and Catharine Croghan Brant (Adonwentishon). His father Joseph was a Mohawk chief who became famous during the American Revolutionary War. His mother Catharine was from an important Mohawk lineage: while her father was the Irish trader George Croghan, her mother was the sister of Johannes Tekarihoga, one of the hereditary Mohawk civil leaders (or sachems). Because the Mohawks were a matrilineal society, the title "Tekarihoga" did not pass from father to son. Instead, the women in the family selected the next Tekarihoga from their male relatives. As clan Mother, Catharine Brant would name Johannes Tekarihoga's successor. At a young age, her son John became an obvious candidate for the next Tekarihoga.

The family moved near Burlington Bay in 1802. John Brant studied at Ancaster and Niagara (Niagara-on-the-Lake). In the War of 1812, Brant and John Norton led native warriors to stop an American attack at the Battle of Queenston Heights in October 1812. He was made a lieutenant in the Indian Department and was involved in several battles throughout the war.

He helped his uncle try to get a formal deed for grant of land along the Grand River called the Haldimand Proclamation to the Six Nations. In 1821, he went to England with Robert Johnson Kerr after Lieutenant-Governor Sir Peregrine Maitland informed them that they had no title to the northern part of the grant. Despite their efforts, the government of the colony managed to retain control over the sale of native lands in the area. Brant encouraged the building of schools for his people. In 1828, he was appointed resident superintendent for the Six Nations of the Grand River. In 1830, he was elected to the Legislative Assembly of Upper Canada for Haldimand. He was the first Indian to sit in Upper Canada's parliament as a lawmaker. But a year later, his right to hold the seat was questioned as he did not own the amount of property required under the law at the time to sit in the Assembly, and he was thrown out of office. John Warren was declared elected.

In about 1830 his mother Catharine named him as the next Tekarihoga, succeeding his recently deceased uncle Henry Tekarihoga. Brant held the office for only a short time; he died in 1832 near Brantford, a victim of a cholera pandemic.

He was married to Ann Seabrook on February 17, 1825.

 References 

Kelsay, Isabel Thompson. Joseph Brant, 1743–1807, Man of Two Worlds.'' Syracuse, New York: Syracuse University Press, 1984.  (hardback);  (1986 paperback).
 

1794 births
1832 deaths
British Indian Department
Indigenous people of the War of 1812
Indigenous leaders in Ontario
Deaths from cholera
Members of the Legislative Assembly of Upper Canada
Canadian Mohawk people